James Gordon Bartlett Reid (1921–1991) was a businessperson and politician in Newfoundland. He represented Trinity South in the Newfoundland House of Assembly from 1972 to 1975 and from 1982 to 1989.

Early life 
The son of F.E. Reid, he was born in Heart's Delight and was educated there.

Military career 
Reid served in the Royal Air Force during World War II.

Business career 
After the war, he established several businesses in the Heart's Delight area, including a construction and heavy equipment company.

Political career 
Reid became the first mayor of Heart's Delight-Islington in 1972.

He was elected to the provincial assembly in 1972 and served in the Newfoundland cabinet as Minister of Community and Social Development. Reid was defeated when he ran for reelection in 1975; he was reelected in 1982 and 1985. He did not run for reelection in 1989 due to poor health.

References 

1921 births
1991 deaths
Progressive Conservative Party of Newfoundland and Labrador MHAs
Mayors of places in Newfoundland and Labrador
Members of the Executive Council of Newfoundland and Labrador
Royal Air Force personnel of World War II